, also known as Nyaruko-san: Another Crawling Chaos, is a Japanese light novel series written by Manta Aisora and illustrated by Koin. It was inspired by H. P. Lovecraft's Cthulhu mythos. The series' twelve volumes were published by Soft Bank Creative under their GA Bunko imprint between April 2009 and March 2014.

A flash-animated original video animation (OVA) by DLE titled Haiyore! Nyaruko was published in between October 2009 and March 2010, followed by a television series, Haiyore! Nyaruko: Remember My Mr. Lovecraft, which aired in Japan between December 2010 and February 2011. An anime television series by Xebec aired in Japan between April and June 2012 and a second season aired between April and June 2013. An OVA was released in 2015. Two manga adaptations have been produced. A video game adaptation, developed by 5pb. for PlayStation Vita was released in Japan in May 2013.

Synopsis 

The story of Haiyore! Nyaruko-san centers around Nyaruko, a formless Lovecraftian deity of chaos (Nyarlathotep) who can take on the shape of a seemingly cute silver-haired girl. Mahiro Yasaka is a normal high school boy who is being chased by a fearsome black alien one night, until Nyaruko saves him. She explains that the creatures from H. P. Lovecraft's works are actually races of aliens, and that she has been sent to Earth by the Space Defense Agency to protect him from being kidnapped by an alien trafficker. Aliens find Mahiro and the Earth strangely attractive, for entertainment, auction, or resources. One by one, the Great Old Ones land on Earth illegally. Eventually, Nyaruko and two other Lovecraftian creatures, Cthugha and Hastur, end up being freeloaders at Mahiro's place. Mahiro has become accustomed to his protection detail of Nyarlathotep (Nyaruko), Cthugha, and Hastur making his life fascinating.

Publication 
Haiyore! Nyaruko-san began as a light novel series written by Manta Aisora with illustrations by Koin. The series, spanning twelve volumes, was published by Soft Bank Creative under their GA Bunko imprint between April 15, 2009, and March 17, 2014. Short stories have been published in Soft Bank Creative's GA Magazine.

Volume list

Media

Anime 

A Flash original video animation titled  was produced by DLE and directed by Azuma Tani. The first episode was streamed on October 23, 2009. Further episodes were published on December 19, 2010 on DVD as part of the GA Magazine Vol. 3. The first eight episodes are about one to two minutes in length, while the final episode is about six minutes long.

Another anime series titled , also produced by DLE and directed by Azuma Tani, aired 11 episodes on BS11 Digital between December 11, 2010, and February 26, 2011. Each episode is about four minutes in length. The twelfth episode was released as an original video animation included with the Haiyoru! Nyaruani 1&2 Perfect Box, a DVD compilation containing both Flash anime series.

An anime television series produced by Xebec aired in Japan between April 10 and June 26, 2012. Crunchyroll streamed the series with English subtitles outside Asia, along with the two Flash series, under the name Nyarko-san: Another Crawling Chaos. A DVD containing a short original video animation based on the short story  was offered to those who purchased all the BD/DVD volumes of the first season. NIS America licensed the series in North America and released on subtitled Blu-ray Disc on April 15, 2014.

A second season called  aired in Japan between April 8 and July 1, 2013, and was also simulcast by Crunchyroll. An OVA episode on DVD was released for buying all of the second season's Blu-ray Disc or DVD volumes.

An OVA  was released on June 19, 2015.

Music 
Opening themes
 by Ushiro kara Haiyori-tai G (Kana Asumi, Miyu Matsuki and Yuka Ōtsubo) (Season 1)
 by Ushiro kara Haiyori-tai G (Season 2)
 by Ushiro kara Haiyori-tai G (F OVA)
Ending themes
 by Kana Asumi (Haiyoru! Nyaruani)
 by Lisp (Kana Asumi, Azusa Kataoka and Sayuri Hara) (Haiyoru! Nyaruani: Remember My Mr. Lovecraft)
 by RAMM ni Haiyoru Nyaruko-san (Kana Asumi) (Season 1, eps 1-11)
 by Ushiro kara Haiyori-tai (Kana Asumi, Miyu Matsuki and Yuka Ōtsubo (Season 1, ep 12)
 by RAMM ni Haiyoru Nyaruko-san (Season 2, eps 1–2, 6, 11)
 by RAMM ni Haiyoru Jashin-san (Kana Asumi, Miyu Matsuki and Rie Kugimiya) (Season 2, eps 3, 8)
 by RAMM ni Haiyoru Tamao-san (Yuka Ōtsubo) (Season 2, eps 4, 7)
"Sister, Friend, Lover" by RAMM ni Haiyoru Kūko-san to Kūne-san (Miyu Matsuki and Ryōka Yuzuki) (Season 2, eps 5, 9)
 by RAMM ni Haiyoru Mahiro-san to Yoichi-san (Eri Kitamura and Wataru Hatano) (Season 2, ep 10)
 by RAMM ni Haiyoru Nyaruko-san (Kana Asumi) (Season 2, ep 12)
 by RAMM ni Haiyoru Nyaruko-san (F OVA)

Manga
A manga adaptation titled Haiyore! Nyaruko-san illustrated by Kei Okazaki was serialized in Shueisha's Miracle Jump magazine from May 6, 2011 to April 10, 2013 and was compiled in two volumes. A four-panel comic strip manga titled  illustrated by Sōichirō Hoshino was serialized in Flex Comix's Flex Comix Blood from October 5, 2011 to November 12, 2014 and was compiled in five volumes. An anthology volume was published by Holp Shuppan on November 11, 2012.

Video game 
In December 2012 5pb. announced the development of a visual novel, titled  in which the player assumes the role of Mahiro Yasaka. The game's story is based on the first season of the anime television series, with some additional content. The game was released on PlayStation Vita on May 30, 2013, in both regular and limited editions.

Reception 
The series has received mixed reviews. Aiden Foote from THEM Anime Reviews gave the first season (Nyarko-san: Another Crawling Chaos) a 3/5 star rating. In his review, Foote says that the anime "should have been a whole better [sic] and could well have been" citing the over-pandering as an issue. He went on to say that a character as well-liked as Nyaruko deserved more when it came to a love interest.

See also 
 Call of Cthulhu - The major source of gags; characters from the R'lyeh Antique books also appear in this series.

Notes

References

External links

 
 
 
 at 5pb. 

2009 anime OVAs
2009 Japanese novels
2010 anime television series debuts
2011 manga
2012 anime television series debuts
2013 anime television series debuts
2013 video games
Anime and manga based on light novels
Cthulhu Mythos stories
Drama audio recordings
Extraterrestrial life in popular culture
GA Bunko
IG Port franchises
Japan-exclusive video games
Japanese LGBT-related animated television series
Light novels
Moe anthropomorphism
PlayStation Vita games
PlayStation Vita-only games
Romantic comedy anime and manga
Seinen manga
Shōnen manga
Shueisha manga
Television shows based on light novels
TV Tokyo original programming
Video games developed in Japan
Visual novels
Xebec (studio)